Rise Radiant is the fifth studio album by Australian progressive metal band Caligula's Horse, released through Inside Out Music on 10 May 2020. It is the first album to feature bassist Dale Prinsse, who joined the band in 2019.

Track listing

Bonus tracks

Personnel
Caligula's Horse

 Jim Grey – lead vocals
 Sam Vallen – lead guitar, "everything else"
 Adrian Goleby – guitar
 Dale Prinsse – bass
 Josh Griffin – drums

Production

 Sam Vallen – production, engineering
 Jens Bogren – mixing, mastering
 Jared Adlam – engineering
 Dale Prinsse – additional engineering
 Rory Cavanagh – additional engineering
 Chris Stevenson-Mangos – artwork, design
Production credits taken from album liner notes.

Charts

References

2020 albums
Caligula's Horse (band) albums